Jan Karel Lenstra (born 19 December 1947, in Zaandam) is a Dutch mathematician and operations researcher, known for his work on scheduling algorithms, local search, and the travelling salesman problem.

Lenstra received his Ph.D. from the University of Amsterdam in 1976, advised by Gijsbert de Leve. He then became a researcher at the Centrum Wiskunde & Informatica, where he remained until 1989. After taking positions at the Eindhoven University of Technology (where he became Dean of the Faculty of Mathematics and Computer Science) and the Georgia Institute of Technology, he returned to CWI as its director in 2003. He stepped down in 2011, and at that time became a CWI Fellow. He was editor-in-chief of Mathematics of Operations Research from 1993 to 1998, and is editor-in-chief of Operations Research Letters since 2002.

Lenstra became an INFORMS fellow in 2004.
In 1997, he was awarded the EURO Gold Medal, the highest distinction within Operations Research in Europe.
In 2011, he was made a knight of the Order of the Netherlands Lion, and the CWI organized a symposium in his honor.

Lenstra is the brother of Arjen Lenstra, Andries Lenstra, and Hendrik Lenstra, all of whom are also mathematicians. He is married to Karen Aardal, in 2020 professor at Delft University.

Publications 

 Jan Karel Lenstra // DBLP, Universität Trier
 Peter J. M. van Laarhoven, Emile H. L. Aarts, Jan Karel Lenstra. - Job Shop Scheduling by Simulated Annealing (info) // Operations Research, pp. 113-125.
 Emile H. L. Aarts, Peter J. M. van Laarhoven, Jan Karel Lenstra, Nico L. J. Ulder: A Computational Study of Local Search Algorithms for Job Shop Scheduling. // INFORMS Journal on Computing 6(2): 118-125 (1994) (dblp)

References

Sources 

Album Academicum (website University of Amsterdam)

1947 births
Living people
Dutch mathematicians
Dutch operations researchers
University of Amsterdam alumni
Academic staff of the Eindhoven University of Technology
Georgia Tech faculty
Knights of the Order of the Netherlands Lion
People from Zaanstad
Fellows of the Institute for Operations Research and the Management Sciences